Saurogobio gracilicaudatus is a species of cyprinid fish endemic to China.

References

Saurogobio
Fish described in 1977